Hypodacne is a genus of well polished beetles in the family Euxestidae. There is one described species in Hypodacne, H. punctata.

References

Further reading

 

Coccinelloidea genera
Articles created by Qbugbot